"Jesus Saves" is the name of a well-known Christian hymn.  "Jesus Saves" may also refer to:

 Jesus Saves (novel), a novel by Darcey Steinke
 "Jesus Saves," a song on the album Reign in Blood by Slayer
 "Jesus Saves" a song on the album Streets: A Rock Opera by Savatage
 "Jesus Saves", a song on the album We Cry Out: The Worship Project by Jeremy Camp

See also
 Jesus Saves Live, an album by Travis Cottrell